Rossana Dinamarca (born 2 January 1974) is a Chilean exile and Swedish Left Party politician. She served as member of the Riksdag from 30 September 2002 to 24 September 2018.

References

External links
Rossana Dinamarca at the Riksdag website

1974 births
21st-century Swedish women politicians
Chilean emigrants to Sweden
Members of the Riksdag 2002–2006
Members of the Riksdag 2006–2010
Members of the Riksdag 2010–2014
Members of the Riksdag 2014–2018
Members of the Riksdag from the Left Party (Sweden)
Living people
People from Santiago
Swedish politicians of Chilean descent
Women members of the Riksdag